Ivan Pavlovich Minayev or Minayeff (Иван Павлович Минаев; 21 October 1840 – 13 June 1890) was the first Russian Indologist whose disciples included Serge Oldenburg, F. Th. Stcherbatsky, and Dmitry Kudryavsky.

As a student of Vasily Vasiliev at the University of Saint Petersburg he developed an interest in Pali literature and went abroad to prepare a catalogue of Pali manuscripts at the British Museum and the Bibliothèque Nationale (still unpublished). His Russian-language Pali grammar (1872) was soon translated into French (1874) and English (1882).

Minayev's magnum opus, Buddhism: Untersuchungen und Materialien, was printed in 1887. "Minaev was almost the first European orientalist... to feel that the study of Buddhism and Pali was a must for the proper understanding of ancient Indian history and society".

As a member of the Russian Geographical Society he travelled in India and Burma and Nepal in 1874—75, 1880, and 1885—86. His travel journals were published in English in 1958 and 1970.

References 

1840 births
1890 deaths
People from Tambov
Russian Indologists
Russian scholars of Buddhism
Translators from Pali
19th-century translators